Prom Queen: The Marc Hall Story is a Canadian television film, which aired on CTV in 2004. The film is about Marc Hall, a gay Canadian teenager whose legal fight (Marc Hall v. Durham Catholic School Board) to bring a same-sex date to his Catholic high school prom made headlines in 2002.

Plot
In Inniston, Marc Hall (Aaron Ashmore) is popular and his sexuality relatively well-accepted by his classmates and later his parents. But when he decides to take his boyfriend to the prom as his date, he finds he has stepped over the line straight into the fight of his young life and sends ripples through Canada's media. From just an ordinary teenager, he becomes an icon for LGBT rights across the nation when he discovers he is battling discrimination to date whomever he wants within the spotlight of the nation's media.

Cast
 Aaron Ashmore as Marc Hall
 Mac Fyfe as Jason
 Tamara Hope as Carly
 Trevor Blumas as Beau
 Dave Foley as Principal Warrick
 Fiona Reid as the school board chief.
 Laura Vandervoort as Young Girl (uncredited)

Production
The offices of Toronto-based Tapestry Pictures were vandalised one week before the film's television premiere, and the producers feared the vandalism was linked to its controversial film it was about to release. It was shown on terrestrial TV on CTV on 1 June 2004.

Theatrical adaptation 
A musical adaptation of Prom Queen entitled The Louder We Get directed by Lonny Price with songs by Colleen Dauncey and lyrics by Akiva-Romer Segal premiered in January 2020 at Theatre Calgary after a developmental production in September 2018 in London, Ontario. Selections were featured in the 2017 NAMT festival in New York.

See also
 Marc Hall v. Durham Catholic School Board

References

External links
 

English-language Canadian films
Canadian drama television films
Canadian LGBT-related television films
Biographical films about LGBT people
2004 television films
2004 films
Films about proms
Films directed by John L'Ecuyer
2000s English-language films
2000s Canadian films